Iodosilane is a chemical compound of silicon, hydrogen, and iodine. It is a colorless monoclinic crystal of space group P21/c at −157 °C.

Preparation
Iodosilane is the first product of the reaction between monosilane and iodine, the other products being di-, tri- and finally tetraiodosilane (silicon tetraiodide).

It can also produced by the reaction of phenylsilane or chlorophenylsilane with hydrogen iodide.

Properties 
At low temperatures, iodosilant quickly reacts with [Co(CO)4]− to form SiH3Co(CO)4.

Further reading

References

Silanes
Iodides
Nonmetal halides